The official secretary to the governor-general of New Zealand is a member in the household of the governor-general of New Zealand. They are the general manager of Government House, Wellington and Government House, Auckland.  Prior to 1917 they were known as the private secretary to the governor.

The Secretary is employed by the Department of the Prime Minister and Cabinet.

List of official secretaries

See also
 Official Secretary to the Governor-General of Australia
 Secretary to the Governor General of Canada

External links
 DPMC Organisation Chart, accessed 26 December 2014
 About DPMC, accessed 26 December 2014
 Management at Government House, accessed 8 September 2014

Government of New Zealand